Everywhere I Look may refer to:

Music
 "Everywhere I Look", a song on the 1990 Hall & Oates album Change of Season  
 "Everywhere I Look", a song on the 1993 Phil Keaggy album Revelator
 "(Everywhere I Look) I See Your Face" a song on the 2006 Elastic No-No Band album The Very Best of Elastic No-No Band So Far
 "Everywhere I Look", a single by Midway Still

Books
 Everywhere I Look (book), a collection of short works by Australian writer Helen Garner

See also
 "Everywhere I Look, There's You", a song performed by Tamara Walker from the soundtrack to View from the Top